Kaja Ziomek (born 3 August 1997) is a Polish speed skater who is specialized in the sprint distances. She competed in the women's 500 metres at the 2018 Winter Olympics.

Personal records

References

External links

1997 births
Living people
Polish female speed skaters
Olympic speed skaters of Poland
Speed skaters at the 2018 Winter Olympics
Speed skaters at the 2022 Winter Olympics
People from Lubin
Sportspeople from Lower Silesian Voivodeship
Speed skaters at the 2012 Winter Youth Olympics
World Single Distances Speed Skating Championships medalists
World Sprint Speed Skating Championships medalists
21st-century Polish women